Abdominal migraine is a variant type of migraine. It primarily affects children, and is rare in adults. It mainly causes episodes of abdominal pain without an accompanying headache. It is poorly understood. It is difficult to confirm the diagnosis, as periumbilical abdominal pain has an extensive differential diagnosis. It may be treated with analgesia in some patients, and other medications. Avoiding triggers can prevent an episode of abdominal migraine.

Signs and Symptoms 

Symptoms of abdominal migraine may include:

 Abdominal pain
 Nausea
 Vomiting
 Headache
 Photosensitivity
Loss of appetite
Pallor
These occur in distinct episodes. This can have a significant effect on day-to-day life. It usually does not occur with a headache. Body mass index is usually unaffected, and physical development is normal.

Causes 
Common migraine triggers may trigger abdominal migraines. Psychological stress (such as from school), a change in location (such as travel), changes to sleep, and exercise when this is not wanted, may all cause abdominal migraine.

Pathophysiology 
Abdominal migraine is poorly understood.

Diagnosis 
As with other types of migraines, there is no diagnostic test to identify abdominal migraines. Diagnosis is based on symptoms, a family history of migraines, and eliminations of other possible causes. It can take time before a diagnosis is made, as symptoms are not specific to abdominal migraine.

Diagnostic criteria from the International Classification of Headache Disorders are:
A. At least 5 attacks fulfilling criteria B-D.
B. Attacks of abdominal pain lasting 1–72 hours (untreated or unsuccessfully treated)
C. Abdominal pain has all of the following characteristics:
1. midline location, periumbilical or poorly localized
2. dull or "just sore" quality
3. moderate or severe intensity
D. During abdominal pain at least 2 of the following:
1. loss of appetite
2. nausea
3. vomiting
4. pallor
E. Not attributed to another disorder

Differential diagnosis 
Abdominal migraine must be distinguished from other causes of chronic or recurrent abdominal pain. These include irritable bowel syndrome, peptic ulcer disease, gastroesophageal reflux disease, mast cell activation syndrome, and celiac artery compression syndrome. It must also be distinguished from causes of acute abdominal pain, such as appendicitis, as wrong diagnosis may lead to unnecessary appendectomy.

Treatment

Short term 
Analgesia may be effective against abdominal migraine in some patients. Avoidance of intense light tends to have a short-term beneficial effect.

Long term 
Avoidance of triggers can be very helpful. Medications such as pizotifen, propanolol, and cyproheptadine may be used in rare circumstances.

Prognosis 
Abdominal migraine can have a significant impact on day-to-day life. Children may miss school or other activities. It resolves in many patients. Prognosis is generally good in children, but variable in adults.

Epidemiology 
Abdominal migraine primarily affects children, for whom it is a common cause of chronic abdominal pain. It may be as high as 9% or as low as 1% among children. It is rare in adults. However, children diagnosed with abdominal migraines may have migraine headaches as adults. The mean age of diagnosis is 7 years. It appears to be slightly more common in women.

History 
This condition was first described in 1921 by Buchanan. It was once considered a controversial diagnosis. However, it is now accepted as a common cause of chronic abdominal pain in children.

References 

Migraine